The 1938 French Championships (now known as the French Open) was a tennis tournament that took place on the outdoor clay courts at the Stade Roland-Garros in Paris, France. The tournament ran from 2 June until 11 June. It was the 43rd staging of the French Championships and the second Grand Slam tournament of the year.

Finals

Men's singles

 Don Budge defeated  Roderich Menzel   6–3, 6–2, 6–4

Women's singles

 Simonne Mathieu defeated  Nelly Adamson  6–0, 6–3

Men's doubles
 Bernard Destremau /  Yvon Petra defeated  Don Budge /  Gene Mako  3–6, 6–3, 9–7, 6–1

Women's doubles
 Simonne Mathieu  /  Billie Yorke   defeated  Arlette Halff /  Nelly Landry 6–3, 6–3

Mixed doubles
 Simonne Mathieu /  Dragutin Mitić   defeated  Nancye Wynne Bolton  /  Christian Boussus  2–6, 6–3, 6–4

References

External links
 French Open official website

French Championships
French Championships (tennis) by year
French Championships
French Championships
French Championships